Angel Unzueta is a Spanish comic book artist.

Selected works
 2000 AD #1076 "Danse Macabre" (Fleetway, 1998)
 Legion of Super-Heroes vol. 4, #124–125 (DC Comics, 2000)
 The Flash #164–169 (DC, 2000–2001)
 Green Lantern Corps vol. 2 #14–17 (DC, 2007)
 Titans vol. 2 #12–13, 16–19, 21–22 (DC, 2009–2010)
 Teen Titans vol. 4 #23–24 (DC, 2013)
 Death of Wolverine: The Weapon X Program #4–5 (Marvel Comics, 2014–2015)
 Star Wars: Shattered Empire #2–3 (Marvel, 2015)
 Star Wars Annual #1 (Marvel, 2015)
 Avengers: Standoff! Assault on Pleasant Hill Omega #1 (Marvel, 2016)
 Captain America: Sam Wilson #7, 9–10, 15–16, 19 (Marvel, 2016–)
 Star Wars: Poe Dameron #7, #14– (Marvel, 2016–)

Notes

External links
 
 

Living people
Spanish comics artists
Year of birth missing (living people)